The three teams in this group played against each other on a home-and-away basis. Poland and the Soviet Union finished level on points, a play-off on neutral ground was played to decide who would qualify. The winner Soviet Union qualified for the sixth FIFA World Cup held in Sweden.

Table

Matches

Play-off
Poland and USSR finished level on points, a play-off on neutral ground was played to decide who would qualify.

References

External links
FIFA official page
RSSSF - 1958 World Cup Qualification
Allworldcup

6
1957 in Soviet football
1957 in Polish football
1957 in Finnish football